Faouaz Nadirin (born 24 April 1953) is a Syrian weightlifter. He competed in the men's featherweight event at the 1980 Summer Olympics.

References

1953 births
Living people
Syrian male weightlifters
Olympic weightlifters of Syria
Weightlifters at the 1980 Summer Olympics
Place of birth missing (living people)